Razia Butt was an Urdu novelist and playwright from Pakistan. One of the famous popular fiction writer of the 1960s and 1970s, she is often compared with English writer Barbara Cartland due to her popularity among the household readers.

Some of her works have been adapted into television serials and films, including Bano.

Background
Razia Niaz was born in Wazirabad on 19 May 1924. She spent most of her childhood in Peshawar.

Career
She first appeared in a literary journal around 1940 when she was in her teens. She later developed her first published story into a novel, Naila. Butt also wrote radio plays. Films such as Naila, Saiqa and television serials such as Saiqa and Dastaan are based on her novels.

Married in 1946, Razia Butt resumed writing in 1950s after a break of some years. She wrote 51 novels and 350 short stories.

Butt wrote an autobiography, Bichhray Lamhe.

Death
Razia Butt died in Lahore on 4 October 2012 after a protracted illness.

Bibliography

Novels
 Aadhi Kahani (Lit: Half a story)
 Aag (Lit: Fire)
 Aaina (Lit: Mirror)
 Aneela
 Bano (adapted as TV drama Dastan)
 Beena
 Chahat
 Darling
 Faslay (Lit: Distances)
 Mein kon hon (Lit: Who am I?)
 Naila
 Najia
 Nasoor
 Noreena
 Reeta
 Roop
 Sabeen
 Saiqa (novel)
 Wehshi
 Samina
 Sawaneh
 Shabbo
 Zindgi (Lit: Life)
 Amma (Mother) (adapted as TV drama written by Ahmed Naveed)
 Mehru
 Zari

Others
 Bichhray Lamhe (autobiography)

Dramatisation of works

Television
 Amma (mother) dramatized by drama writer Ahmed Naveed.PTV
 Bano as Dastaan – Hum TV 2010
 Naila
 Noerena (PTV 1995)
 Saiqa – Hum TV – 2009
 Wehshi (HUM TV) 2022

Films
 Naila (1965)
 Saiqa (1968)
 Anila (1969)
 Noreen (1970)
 Mohabbat (1972)
 Khalish (1972)
 Payasa (1973)
 Mohabbat ho to aisi (1989)
 Gulabo (2008)

Awards
 1969 - Nigar Award for Best Scriptwriter of Saiqa.
 2012 - Hum Honorary Most Challenging Subject Award for Dastaan

References

External links
Razia Butt on IMDb

1924 births
2012 deaths
Pakistani novelists
Pakistani dramatists and playwrights
Pakistani women short story writers
Urdu-language novelists
Urdu-language short story writers
Pakistani people of Kashmiri descent
20th-century novelists
20th-century Pakistani short story writers
20th-century Pakistani writers
20th-century Pakistani women writers
People from Rawalpindi
People from Wazirabad
Punjabi people
Pakistani women novelists
Writers from Lahore
Pakistani literary critics
Pakistani women literary critics